Bassa Sports Club is an Antigua and Barbuda football team playing in the local top division. They have won the premier league many times. It is based in All Saints.

History
Bassa have clinched the Antiguan league title five times. They took part in the CFU Club Championship in 2004, 2005 and 2007 in an attempt to qualify for the CONCACAF Champions' Cup.

Honours
Antigua and Barbuda Premier Division: 5
2003-04, 2004–05, 2006–07, 2007–08, 2009–10

Antigua and Barbuda FA Cup: 2
2007-08, 2009–10

Performance in CONCACAF competitions
CFU Club Championship: 3 appearances
2004 – First Round — Lost against  Tivoli Gardens 4 – 2 on aggregate
2005 – Quarter-Finals — Lost against  Centro Social Deportivo Barber 7 – 3 on aggregate
2007 – Quarter-Finals — Lost against  Joe Public F.C. 4 – 0

Current squad
Nationality given from place of birth

Football clubs in Antigua and Barbuda